Zhao Ji (born 28 October 1987) also known as Evonne Zhao, is a Chinese actress and model.

Jin is noted for playing Lin Wanyu in the romantic comedy television series iPartment, which was one of the highest ratings in China when it was broadcast.

Early life
Zhao was born in Zichuan District of Zibo city, Shandong province on October 28, 1987. During her early years, she attended Shandong Art Academy and Zibo No.4 High School. She graduated from Shanghai Theatre Academy, majoring in acting.

Acting career
Zhao starred in a number of successful sequels beginning with iPartment, which enjoyed the highest ratings in China and Wang quickly rose to prominence. In the romantic comedy television series iPartment, Zhao played the role of Lin Wanyu, the daughter of a billionaire banker, who falls in love with Lu Zhanbo, This was followed by iPartment 3 and iPartment 4.

Filmography

Film

Television

References

External links

1987 births
People from Zibo
Shanghai Theatre Academy alumni
Actresses from Shandong
Living people
Chinese film actresses
Chinese television actresses